George Douglas Winton (6 October 1929 – 29 October 2006) was a Scottish professional footballer who played as a defender. He played a total of well over 300 matches in the Football League for three clubs, but scored just one senior goal, whilst playing for Burnley.

References

External links

1929 births
2006 deaths
Scottish footballers
Footballers from Perth, Scotland
Association football fullbacks
Burnley F.C. players
Aston Villa F.C. players
Rochdale A.F.C. players
English Football League players
Scotland B international footballers